Cor Melchers (1954 – 15 September 2015) was a Dutch painter.

Life 

Melchers was born and grew up in Huissen. He was a teacher at the primary school De Laarakker in Arnhem. He started painting in 2003 and became more populair with his naive expressionist work. He won the Mieke Bles Art Prize with its romantic landscapes, impressions of villages, towns and Betuwse orchards in 2008. He exhibited, in the Netherlands (including Hotel Pulitzer, Amsterdam) and Italy. His atalier was located where he lived, in Huissen. In 2014 his biography was published "Cor Melchers, schilder van kleurende eenvoud" (translated: Cor Melchers, painter of coloring simplicity.)

Melchers was engaged in promoting art. He gave workshops, collaborated on a children's book, and established Huissen Kunst in de Etalage and art platform Kunstplatform Mea Vota.

On September 15, 2015, Melchers died from legionnaires' disease at the age of 61.

References

External links

Further reading
 Cor Melchers, schilder van kleurende eenvoud 2008

1954 births
2015 deaths
Dutch printmakers
Artists from The Hague
20th-century Dutch painters
Dutch male painters
People from Lingewaard
Deaths from pneumonia in the Netherlands
20th-century printmakers
20th-century Dutch male artists